Castanidium is a genus of cercozoans in the family Castanellidae.

References

External links 

 
 Castanidium at Marine Species Identification

Cercozoa genera
Phaeodaria